The 1945 Kentucky Derby was the 71st running of the Kentucky Derby, held on June 9, 1945. It was won by Hoop Jr., ridden by jockey Eddie Arcaro.

Regularly held on the first Saturday of May, the 1945 edition of the Kentucky Derby was initially scheduled for May 5. However, in December 1944, the director of the Office of War Mobilization, James F. Byrnes, requested that all horse racing tracks suspend racing starting in January 1945, "and to refrain from resuming racing at all tracks until war conditions permit." Days after V-E Day, Byrne's successor at the Office of War Mobilization, Fred M. Vinson, lifted the suspension on horse racing in an announcement on May 10. The Kentucky Derby was subsequently scheduled for June 9, with the Preakness Stakes and Belmont Stakes to follow on June 16 and June 23, respectively.

Full results

 Winning breeder: Robert A. Fairbairn (KY)

References

1945
Kentucky Derby
Derby
May 1945 sports events in the United States